"Counterpoint" is the 104th and tenth episode of the fifth season of Star Trek: Voyager. In this space science fiction television show, a spacecraft, the Federation's USS Voyager is stranded on the wrong side of the galaxy as Earth it must slowly makes its way home. In this episode, Voyager and its crew encounter the Devore aliens, posing particularly difficult choices for the ship's captain, Starfleet Captain Kathryn Janeway.

It was aired on the United Paramount Network (UPN) on December 16, 1998.

It was written by Michael Taylor and directed by Les Landau.

Plot
Voyager is travelling through Devore space, where telepathy is illegal. The crew had encountered a small group of telepaths, and has offered them transport to a wormhole that will allow them to escape the sector.  As Voyager continues, they are continually stopped by Devore ships, led by inspector Kashyk, demanding to inspect the ship for telepaths. Kashyk, who is fascinated by human culture, takes a very forward approach, taking control of the ship and playing Mahler's first symphony to relax the crew, appearing to be aware of the refugees. To hide the refugees, along with their three telepathic crew members, the crew stores their patterns in a transport buffer during the period of inspection, but this is found to ultimately have cumulative deleterious effects on the refugees.  It is decided the method should be avoided if at all possible.

Voyager is surprised when Kashyk arrives in a private ship, and claims to be interested in defecting and helping Voyager transport the refugees to safety. Captain Janeway is highly suspicious of Kashyk's actual motives, but allows him to help with the Brenari's approval. The Brenari point the crew towards Torat, a scientist that has studied the random appearance of the wormhole, and convince him to share the data. Janeway and Kashyk work together to try to identify a pattern in the wormhole's appearance, coming closer together as they make the discovery. The next appearance, deep in Devore space, passes by a large sensor array that Voyager is unable to avoid. With their presence in the sector known, Kashyk prepares to leave the ship, kissing Janeway goodbye and wishing her luck.

Soon, the Devore inspectors arrive, and Kashyk takes on his former forward demeanor. He sends his inspectors out of earshot, upon which Janeway reveals the use of the transporter buffer to hide the refugees.  Kashyk relays this to inspectors, revealing himself as a counter-agent for the Devore.  However, when the Devore re-materialize the transporter buffer, they only find mundane shipping containers filled with vegetables. The Devore become aware of two of Voyagers shuttles en route to the wormhole, containing the telepath refugees, and are unable to catch up to them in time. Janeway reveals she never completely trusted Kashyk's motives, and created this deception. Kashyk and his inspectors, unwilling to have such a failure on their records, are forced to leave the ship alone and unreported, allowing the crew to continue their journey and reunite with their shuttles outside Devore space.

Reception
In 2012, Den of Geek ranked "Counterpoint" as one of the top ten episodes of Star Trek: Voyager. The romance between Janeway and Kashyk was praised by Screen Rant as one of the couples that helped the show, noting the tension between their emotions and duty to their respective morality. Screen Rant also noted that although there may have been real emotions, there was also deception.

In 2017, Business Insider listed "Counterpoint" as one of the most underrated episodes of the Star Trek franchise.

WhatCulture ranked the relationship between Janeway and Kashyk as the 6th most romantic-sexual moment of Star Trek.

In 2017, Den of Geek ranked Mark Harelik as Kashyk as the ninth best guest star on Star Trek: Voyager.

In 2017, Vulture listed this episode as one of the best of Star Trek: Voyager.

In 2020, SyFy said this was the sixth best episode of Star Trek: Voyager, but also the most underrated episode of the series. They note that it is Kate Mulgrew's favorite episode of the series, and call it an "acting showcase" for her. They point out that her character must make "hard choices" as she navigates a suspicious romance in a plot, which they describe as "The Diary of Anne Frank in space."

In 2020, Gizmodo ranked this one of the "must watch" episodes from the series.

In 2020, The Digital Fix said this was the best episode in season five, with tense battle of wits, action and a tease of romance.

Releases 
On November 9, 2004, this episode was released as part of the season five DVD box set of Star Trek: Voyager. The box set includes 7 DVD optical discs with all the episodes in season 5 with some extra features, and episodes have a Dolby 5.1 Digital Audio track.

It was one of the episodes included in the anthology DVD box set Star Trek Fan Collective - Captain's Log; the set also includes episodes from other series in the franchise including Star Trek, Star Trek: The Next Generation, Star Trek: Deep Space Nine, and Enterprise. The set was released on July 24, 2007 in the United States.

On April 25, 2001, this episode was released on LaserDisc in Japan, as part of the half-season collection, 5th Season vol.1 . This included episodes from "Night" to "Bliss" on seven double sided 12 inch optical discs, with English and Japanese audio tracks for the episodes.

References

External links

 

Star Trek: Voyager (season 5) episodes
1998 American television episodes
Television episodes directed by Les Landau